Diana Lee or Diana Lee-Hsu is an American model and actress.

Career
Lee was chosen as Playboys Playmate of the Month for May 1988.   Her centerfold was photographed by Stephen Wayda and Richard Fegley. As an actress, she performed in several Playboy videos and had an appearance in the 1989 James Bond movie Licence to Kill. In the film, Lee played Loti, a Hong Kong narcotic agent. She is also prominently featured in the film's title sequence.

Filmography
Licence to Kill (1989) – Loti
Snapdragon (1993) – Professor Huan
Totally Blonde (2001) – Translator
Collar (2016) – Rebecca Allensworth

References

External links
 

1961 births
American people of Chinese descent
American Playboy Playmates of Asian descent
Living people
Actresses from Seattle
1980s Playboy Playmates
20th-century American actresses
21st-century American women